Real union is a union of two or more states, which share some state institutions in contrast to personal unions; however, they are not as unified as states in a political union. It is a development from personal union and has historically been limited to monarchies.

Unlike personal unions, real unions almost exclusively led to a reduction of sovereignty for the politically weaker constituent. That was the case with Lithuania and Norway, which came under the influence of stronger neighbors, Poland and Denmark respectively, with whom each of them had shared a personal union previously. Sometimes, however, a real union came about after a period of political union. The most notable example of such a move is the Kingdom of Hungary (Lands of the Crown of Saint Stephen), which achieved equal status to Austria (which exercised control over the "Cisleithanian" crown lands) in Austria-Hungary following the Austro-Hungarian Compromise of 1867.

Unions may form for pragmatic reasons, "as was the case in the 1707 union of the parliaments, formed against the backdrop of a succession crisis during a war with France, which did indeed create a unitary British state, into which Scotland and England – although not yet Ireland – were incorporated." Austria-Hungary formed, "with the Austro-Hungarian Compromise of 1867 in the aftermath of the Austro-Prussian War."

Historical examples
Denmark–Norway (1537–1814)
Kingdom of England / Kingdom of Great Britain and Kingdom of Ireland (1542–1800)
Poland–Lithuania (1569–1795)
Finland and Russia (1809–1917)
Poland and Russia (1832–1867):
The Organic Statute replaced the Constitution of 1815 in the aftermath of the failed November Uprising.
Austria-Hungary (1867–1918)

See also
Composite monarchy
Dual monarchy

References

Political systems